The Pirot District is one of nine administrative districts of Southern and Eastern Serbia. It expands to the south-eastern parts of Serbia. According to the 2011 census results, it has a population of 92,277 inhabitants. The administrative center is the city of Pirot.

Municipalities
It encompasses the city of Pirot and the following municipalities:
 Bela Palanka
 Babušnica
 Dimitrovgrad

Demographics

According to the 2011 census results, Pirot District has a population of 92,479 inhabitants.

Ethnic groups

History and culture
The first mention of Pirot are found already in the second century A.D. In its vicinity is the church from the thirteenth century: the Church of St. Petka, and the monastery of St. John the Theologist from the late fourteenth century displays a fine example of the medieval architecture.

Features
Medicinal water from the Zvonci Spa (Zvonačka Banja), a health resort, was used already in the ancient times, and natural beauties of this region are renounced throughout Serbia. The oldest craft, today an industry, is Rug-making: the weaving trade, by which this region has gained its world-wide fame.

See also
 Administrative divisions of Serbia
 Districts of Serbia

References

Note: All official material made by Government of Serbia is public by law. Information was taken from official website.

External links

 
Districts of Southern and Eastern Serbia